Substack is an American online platform that provides publishing, payment, analytics, and design infrastructure to support subscription newsletters. It allows writers to send digital newsletters directly to subscribers. Founded in 2017, Substack is headquartered in San Francisco.

History
Substack was founded in 2017 by Chris Best, the co-founder of Kik Messenger; Jairaj Sethi, a developer; and Hamish McKenzie, a former PandoDaily tech reporter. Best and McKenzie describe Ben Thompson's Stratechery, a subscription-based tech and media newsletter, as a major inspiration for their platform. Christopher Best operates as chief executive as of March 2019.

Content 
Substack users range from journalists to experts to large media sites. Among the high-profile writers to have used the platform are Pulitzer-Prize-winning journalist and author Glenn Greenwald and Seymour Hersh, culture critic Anne Helen Petersen, music essayist Robert Christgau, and food writer Alison Roman. The New York Times columnist Mike Isaac argued in 2019 that some of these companies see newsletters as a more stable means to maintain readers through a more direct connection with writers. In 2020, The New Republic said there was an absence of local news newsletters, especially in contrast to the large number of national-level political newsletters. As of late 2020, large numbers of journalists and reporters were coming to the platform, driven in part by the long-term decline in traditional media (there were half as many newsroom jobs in 2019 as in 2004). Around that time, The New Yorker said that while "Substack has advertised itself as a friendly home for journalism, [...] few of its newsletters publish original reporting; the majority offer personal writing, opinion pieces, research, and analysis." It described Substack's content moderation policy as "lightweight," with rules against "harassment, threats, spam, pornography, and calls for violence; moderation decisions are made by the founders."

In 2019, Substack added support for podcasts and discussion threads among newsletter subscribers.

Major writers on Substack include historian Heather Cox Richardson, journalists Matt Taibbi and Bari Weiss, authors Daniel M. Lavery, George Saunders, travel writer Blake Nelson and Chuck Palahniuk, novelist Salman Rushdie, tech journalist Casey Newton, blogger and journalist Matthew Yglesias, and economist Emily Oster.

As of November 2021, the platform said it had more than 500,000 paying subscribers, representing over one million subscriptions. Substack announced in January 2022 that it would begin private Beta testing video on its platform.

Finances
Authors can decide to make subscription to their newsletter free or paid, and to make specific posts publicly available to non-subscribers. , the minimum fee for a subscription was $5/month or $30/year, and Substack usually takes a 10% fee from subscription payments. Advertising to users plays no role in revenue generation. In February 2019, the platform began allowing creators to monetize podcasts.

Substack reported 11,000 paid subscribers as of 2018, rising to 50,000 in 2019.

Substack raised an initial seed round in 2018 from investors including The Chernin Group, Zhen Fund, Twitch CEO Emmett Shear, and Zynga co-founder Justin Waldron. Andreessen Horowitz provided $15.3 million in Series A funding in 2019, some of which went to bringing high-profile writers into Substack's network. Substack has provided some content creators with advances to start working on their platform. In 2019, the site provided a fellowship to some writers, which included a $3,000 stipend and a one-day workshop in San Francisco.

The decline of sports-oriented publications such as Sports Illustrated, Deadspin, and SB Nation, coupled with the onset of the COVID-19 pandemic, led to a surge in sports journalists moving to write on Substack in 2019 and 2020. However, Substack competes with subscription site The Athletic in this submarket, so McKenzie says the company does not recruit as strongly in that market. In 2020, following the onset of the COVID-19 pandemic, Substack extended grants of $1,000–$3,000 to over 40 writers to begin working on the platform. Substack expanded into comics content in 2021 and signed creators including Saladin Ahmed, Jonathan Hickman, Molly Ostertag, Scott Snyder, and James Tynion IV, paying them while keeping their subscription revenue. After their first year, Substack will take 10 percent of subscription revenue.

The Substack founders reached out to a small pool of writers in 2017 to acquire their first creators. Bill Bishop was among the first to put his newsletter, Sinocism, on Substack, providing his newsletter for $11 a month or $118 a year with daily content. As of 2019, Bishop's Sinocism was the top paid newsletter on the service. By late 2020, the conservative newsletter The Dispatch claimed the title of top Substack user, with more than 100,000 subscribers and over $2 million in first-year revenue, according to founder Steve Hayes. In May 2021, Substack acquired Brooklyn-based startup People & Company.

In August 2020, Substack reported that over 100,000 users were paying for at least one newsletter. As of August 2021, Substack had more than 250,000 paying subscribers and its top ten publishers were making $7 million in annualized revenue.

In April 2022, the New York Times reported Substack may be valued at $650 million. Substack dropped an effort to raise money in May 2022. The company had aimed to raise between $75 million and $100 million.

Privacy incident 
On July 28, 2020, Substack sent out email notifications to all its users about changing privacy policies and notification about CCPA compliance. In this notification email, email addresses of all recipients were inadvertently included in the email 'cc' field rather than in the 'bcc' field. This exposed the email addresses of many Substack users. The company acknowledged the issue on Twitter and said that it was remedied after the initial batch of emails but did not disclose the number of users affected.

Substack Pro 
In March 2021, Substack revealed that it had been experimenting with a revenue sharing program in which it paid advances for writers to create publications on its platform; this became a program known as Substack Pro. Substack has been criticized for not disclosing which writers were part of Substack Pro.

Substack Defender 
Substack provides legal advice to its writers through its program Substack Defender. Lawyers provide a legal review of stories before they are published, and provide advice surrounding cease-and-desist letters related to writers' work.

Criticism

In 2020, popular platforms such as Twitter, Facebook, and YouTube began restricting or removing accounts that they claim spread COVID-19 misinformation, which violates those platforms' content policies. Some prominent authors known for spreading misinformation have moved from those platforms to Substack. The Washington Post mentioned Joseph Mercola, whose content, according to Imran Ahmed, CEO of the Center for Countering Digital Hate, is "so bad no one else will host it"; Joe Rogan, who spreads "conspiracy theories about vaccines"; and Stephen K. Bannon, who spreads "violent rhetoric and false claims about the election in the weeks leading up to the Capitol siege on Jan. 6".

In January 2022, the Center for Countering Digital Hate criticized the company for allowing content which could be dangerous to public health, estimating it earned $2.5 million per year from the top five anti-vax authors alone, who have tens of thousands of subscribers. Presumably in response to press inquiries, the three founders in a blog post affirmed their commitment to minimal censorship.

References

External links

Online companies of the United States
Blog hosting services
Internet properties established in 2017
American companies established in 2017
Companies based in San Francisco
2017 establishments in California